ZZ Boötis is a star system in the constellation Boötes. It varies from magnitude 6.79 to 7.44 over five days.

Observational history
In 1950 Grigory Shajn determined that this star is a double-lined spectroscopic binary, with an approximate period of 4.96 days. Sergei Gaposchkin found from an examination of photographic plates, in 1951, that it was an Algol-type eclipsing binary system. The primary and secondary eclipses are of equal depth, 0.65 magnitudes, meaning the brightness drops by nearly half. The eclipses make up only 6% of the orbital period.

ZZ Boötis is a binary star system, specifically an eclipsing binary. The component stars appear to be of almost equal mass, differing by only 3%.

References

Boötes
121648
F-type main-sequence stars
068064
Bootis, ZZ
Algol variables
Durchmusterung objects